Oxalis adenophylla, commonly known as Chilean oxalis or silver shamrock (among other common names), is an Argentinian and Chilean alpine plant.

It does well in far-north locations such as Sweden, Norway and Nova Scotia (Canada), as well as in purely temperate regions. Its cold-hardiness comes from the bulb's adaptation to freezing during dormancy. It is, however, susceptible to rot in the winter in temperate zones, a problem not present where ground freezes in winter. It is tolerant of some shade, but will bloom most with southern full sunlight .

Cultivation
Hardiness: USDA Zones 4–10. Outside of its native location, it is often used for rock gardens. It can also do well as a houseplant.

In the UK this plant has received the Royal Horticultural Society's Award of Garden Merit.

References

Bibliography

adenophylla
Flora of Chile
Flora of Argentina